Marten Beach is a hamlet in northern Alberta, Canada within the Municipal District of Lesser Slave River No. 124.

Marten Beach is adjacent to Lesser Slave Lake Provincial Park, Carlver Creek to the north and Marten Creek to the south.

History 

The hamlet was founded by Herb Johnson of Plamondon, Alberta and his wife Stevie in the middle of the 20th century. They subdivided the property into the current hamlet and the neighbouring Diamond Willow Resort campground, which they then used for subsequent income.

Demographics 
Marten Beach recorded a population of 38 in the 1991 Census of Population conducted by Statistics Canada.

Attractions 

Other attractions in the area, in addition to the Lesser Slave Lake Provincial Park and Diamond Willow Resort, include the bird observatory within the provincial park, Marten Mountain, Lily Lake, the Oilman's Sand Dunes, and sandy beaches along the lakeshore. Activities horseback riding, bike trails, and year-round fishing.

Notable people 
Preston Manning, former Reform Party of Canada leader, had a cabin in Marten Beach for a period of time.

See also 
List of communities in Alberta
List of hamlets in Alberta

References 

Hamlets in Alberta
Municipal District of Lesser Slave River No. 124